Honeyman: Live 1973 is a live album by rock artist Tim Buckley. The album was recorded as a live radio broadcast for radio station WLIR in New York City, United States on November 27, 1973.

The concert features songs from Buckley's seventh studio album Greetings from L.A. and his 1973 studio album Sefronia. Also featured are the songs Pleasant Street from Goodbye and Hello and Buzzin' Fly from the album Happy Sad. This live album is an example of his transformation from a late 60's folk rock poster boy to a sexualized funk and soul musician.

Track listing
All songs by Tim Buckley unless stated otherwise
(** by Tim Buckley and Larry Beckett)

"Dolphins" (Fred Neil)
"Buzzin' Fly"
"Get On Top" **
"Devil Eyes" **
"Pleasant Street"
"Sally Go 'Round the Roses" (The Jaynetts)
"Stone In Love"
"Honey Man" **
"Sweet Surrender" **

Personnel
Tim Buckley – Vocals, 12-string electric guitar
Joe Falsia - lead guitar
Bernie Mysior - bass
Buddy Helm - drums
Mark Tiernan - keyboards

Tim Buckley live albums
1995 live albums